Marc Leuenberger (born July 24, 1962) is a former Swiss professional ice hockey left winger who last played for HC Fribourg-Gottéron in Switzerland's National League A.

Leuenberger has participated as a member of the Swiss national team at the 1988 Winter Olympics.

References

External links

1962 births
Living people
EHC Biel players
HC Fribourg-Gottéron players
Ice hockey players at the 1988 Winter Olympics
Olympic ice hockey players of Switzerland
Swiss ice hockey left wingers